Nephrotoxicity is toxicity in the kidneys. It is a poisonous effect of some substances, both toxic chemicals and medications, on kidney function. There are various forms, and some drugs may affect kidney function in more than one way. Nephrotoxins are substances displaying nephrotoxicity.

Nephrotoxicity should not be confused with some medications predominantly excreted by the kidneys needing their dose adjusted for the decreased kidney function (e.g., heparin, lithium).

Types of toxicity

Cardiovascular
 General: diuretics, β-blockers, vasodilator agents
 Local: ACE inhibitors, ciclosporin, tacrolimus.

Direct tubular effect
 Proximal convoluted tubule: Aminoglycoside antibiotics (e.g., gentamicin), amphotericin B, cisplatin, radiocontrast media, immunoglobulins, mannitol
 Distal tubule: NSAIDs (e.g. aspirin, ibuprofen, diclofenac), ACE inhibitors, ciclosporin, lithium salts, cyclophosphamide, amphotericin B
 Tubular obstruction: sulphonamides, methotrexate, aciclovir, diethylene glycol, triamterene.

Acute interstitial nephritis
Main article : Acute interstitial nephritis
 β-lactam antibiotics, vancomycin, rifampicin, sulphonamides, ciprofloxacin, NSAIDs, ranitidine, cimetidine, furosemide, thiazides, phenytoin.

Chronic interstitial nephritis
 Lithium salts
 Ciclosporin

Acute glomerulonephritis
Drug-induced glomerular disease is not common but there are a few drugs that have been implicated. Glomerular lesions occur primarily through immune-mediated pathways rather than through direct drug toxicity.
 Heroin and Pamidronate are known to cause focal segmental glomerulosclerosis
 Gold salts therapy can cause membranous nephropathy
 Penicillamine

Causes of diabetes insipidus
 Lithium salts
 Amphotericin B—reversible at low doses, irreversible at high doses
 Fluoride
 Demeclocycline
 Foscarnet

Other nephrotoxins
 Lead, mercury and cadmium salts
 Aristolochic acid, found in some plants and in some herbal supplements derived from those plants, has been shown to have nephrotoxic effects on humans.
 Rhubarb contains some nephrotoxins which can cause inflammation of the kidneys in some people.
 Fumaric acid, aka food additive E297
 Orellanine

Diagnosis
Nephrotoxicity is usually monitored through a simple blood test. A decreased creatinine clearance indicates poor kidney function. In interventional radiology, a patient's creatinine clearance levels are all checked prior to a procedure.

Serum creatinine is another measure of kidney function, which may be more useful clinically when dealing with patients with early kidney disease. Normal creatinine level is between 80 - 120 μmol/L.

Etymology
The word nephrotoxicity uses combining forms of nephro- + tox- + -icity, yielding "kidney poisoning".

See also
 Contrast-induced nephropathy
 Toxicity
 Neurotoxicity
 Ototoxicity
 Onconephrology

References

Further reading
 
 

Toxins by organ system affected
Nephrology